Aspirin is a Persian-language TV series produced, directed, and written by Farhad Najafi. The series was produced in Iran by Real Move Entertainment, and premiered on 10 September 2015.

The story is a drama about a doctor who performs a strange experiment on one of his male patients.

The show is 50 minutes long.  Season one has 17 episodes.

External links
IMDb 
Official Website
 Instagram Page

References

Iranian television shows